Cerithium interstriatum is a species of sea snail, a marine gastropod mollusk in the family Cerithiidae.

Distribution
The distribution of Cerithium interstriatum includes the Western Central Pacific.
 Guam
 New Zealand

Description
The size of the shell varies between 8 mm and 33 mm.

References

  Petit, R. E. (2009). George Brettingham Sowerby, I, II & III: their conchological publications and molluscan taxa. Zootaxa. 2189: 1–218

External links
 

Cerithiidae
Gastropods described in 1855